The Warfield Theatre, colloquially referred to as The Warfield, is a 2,300-seat music venue located in the Theatre District in downtown San Francisco. It was built as a vaudeville theater and opened as the Loews Warfield on May 13, 1922.

History
In the 1920s, The Warfield was a popular location that featured vaudeville and other major performances, such as Al Jolson, Louis Armstrong, and Charlie Chaplin. The theater opened as the Loews Warfield, named after David Warfield. It later became known as the Fox Warfield.

New Life came to the Warfield in 1979 when Bob Dylan played 14 shows at the start of his first Gospel Tour in November 1979, and again 12 shows in November 1980 during his "A Musical Retrospective Tour". The Warfield had an appeal as a rock concert venue because it has more intimacy and better sound quality than an arena, yet has an occupancy of over 2,000 persons. The venerable hall has been rocking ever since.

Like many historic theaters, its main floor had the seats removed in the 1980s for general admission and dancing. Prior to the removal of the seats, Joe Strummer of The Clash once refused to play unless the first two rows of seats were removed to allow for dancing. It is a favorite venue for performance among many entertainers.

In 1980, the Grateful Dead played 15 sold-out shows there, featuring both an acoustic and two electric sets. The shows were a celebration of the band's fifteenth anniversary and done as a show of appreciation for their loyal fans. These, along with a sold-out 8 night run at New York's Radio City Music Hall were recorded for release as two double albums; one, all acoustic called Reckoning, the other, electric, called Dead Set. Jerry Garcia also made the Warfield a second home, performing a record 88 times there with his various side bands, when not touring with the Dead.

On May 9, 1991, Guns N' Roses performed the first of a few "secret warm-up theatre gigs" prior to the official opening of their Use Your Illusion Tour.

Current use as music venue

In 2001, thrash metal band Slayer recorded the concert film War at the Warfield (2003) there.

On November 12, 2003, hard rock band Korn performed during a small club tour, which is a rarity for the band.

In May 2008, The Warfield changed management.

The final show with Bill Graham Presents performance by Phil Lesh ran until 3:30 AM, May 19, 2008.

The venue was closed pending renovations by new lessee, Goldenvoice/AEG Live. It was scheduled to reopen in September 2008, with George Lopez to give the first performance.

In September 2011, Dream Theater played their first U.S. show with Mike Mangini on the Dramatic Turn of Events Tour at the Warfield. This was their first show in the U.S. without founding drummer Mike Portnoy.

References

External links

The Warfield Official Website
Historic Photos of the Warfield in the SF Main Library collection
More Historic Photos of the Warfield

1922 establishments in California
Music venues completed in 1922
Music venues in the San Francisco Bay Area
Theatres in San Francisco
Music venues in San Francisco
Landmarks in San Francisco
Loew's Theatres buildings and structures
Market Street (San Francisco)